Marie Déa (born Odette Alice Marie Deupès 17 May 1912 – 1 March 1992) was a French actress. She appeared in more than 50 films from 1939 to 1983.

She was married to the actor Lucien Nat.

Selected filmography

External links 
 

1912 births
1992 deaths
French film actresses
20th-century French actresses